Khalid Ahmed Showky El Islambouli (15 January 1955 – 15 April 1982) was an Egyptian army officer who planned and participated in the assassination of Egyptian President Anwar Sadat, during the annual 6th October victory parade on 6 October 1981. Islambouli stated that his primary motivation for the assassination was Sadat's signing of the Camp David Accords with Israel and Sadat's plan for a more progressive Egypt. Islambouli was tried before an Egyptian court-martial, found guilty, and sentenced to death by firing squad. Following his execution, he was declared a martyr by many radicals in the Islamic world, and became an inspirational symbol for radical Islamic movements as one of the first 'modern martyrs of Islam'.

Early years and career
Islambouli was born in Minya Governorate. His father was an Egyptian legal advisor and his mother, Qadria Ali Yusuf, was of Turkish descent. 

After graduating from the Egyptian Military Academy, he was commissioned as an officer in the Artillery Forces of the Egyptian Army with the rank of second lieutenant. Sometime after this appointment, Islambouli joined the proscribed Egyptian Islamic Jihad movement. Between 1976 and 1980, he served mostly as a staff officer or as fire direction officer for various artillery batteries, battalions and regiments. In March 1980, he got his first field command, an artillery platoon gun line in the 116th Field Artillery Brigade based in Cairo. His command included three 'active' field howitzers, a reserve field gun, five to six transport trucks, seven jeeps, signaling equipment, light infantry weapons such as assault rifles, medium machine guns, anti-tank rockets, light mortars, and sniper rifles for organic defence, and around 45 soldiers/conscripts, with a second lieutenant and a sergeant acting as second-in-command and third-in-command respectively. His role was to take firing missions and orders from the Battery HQ.

Assassination of Sadat

Islambouli and his platoon originally were not supposed to participate in the October parade, but they were chosen by the Military Intelligence, which was infiltrated by Islamist sympathizers under Colonel Abbud al-Zumar, to replace a platoon from the 133rd Artillery Battalion which was excused from participation for apparently failing some routine tests and checks.

Once his platoon containing three heavy trucks towing M-46 field artillery guns began to approach the President's platform, Islambouli, along with Junior Sergeant Abdelhameed Abdul Salaam, 31, Corporal Ata Tayel Hameeda Raheel, 21, and Corporal Hussein Abbas, 21, leapt from their truck and ran towards the stand while lobbing grenades toward where the President was standing with other Egyptian and foreign dignitaries.

Execution
Islambouli was captured immediately after the assassination. He and twenty-three conspirators, including eight military personnel, were tried before an Egyptian court-martial. Found guilty of murder, 27-year-old Islambouli was executed by firing squad on 15 April 1982.

Relatives
Islambouli's younger brother Mohammed Showqi Al-Islambouli came close to assassinating the Egyptian President and Sadat's successor Hosni Mubarak on 22 June 1995 on the way from Addis Ababa International Airport to an African summit in the city. Showqi and his associates opened fire on the armour-plated limousine destroying most of the escort vehicles. However, Mubarak was saved by the skills of his chauffeur, who U-turned the damaged limousine and raced back to the airport where the presidential plane was waiting with running engines.

Legacy
Islambouli continues to serve as an inspirational symbol for Islamist terrorist groups throughout the world. In 1982, Iran issued a stamp in his honor, showing him shouting defiantly from behind bars.
Also they named a street in Tehran after him.
On 31 July 2004, "The al-Islambouli Brigades of al-Qaeda" claimed responsibility for an assassination attempt on Shaukat Aziz, then a candidate for the post of Prime Minister of Pakistan. On 24 August 2004, a Chechen group calling itself "The al Islambouli Brigades" issued a statement claiming responsibility for the bombing of two Russian passenger aircraft.

References

1955 births
1982 deaths
1981 murders in Egypt
20th-century executions by Egypt
Egyptian assassins
Egyptian Islamists
Egyptian Military Academy alumni
Egyptian people convicted of murder
Egyptian people of Turkish descent
Islamist assassins
Muslims with branch missing
People convicted of murder by Egypt
People executed by Egypt by firing squad
Executed Egyptian people
Executed assassins
Sunni Islamists
Anwar Sadat
Assassins of presidents
People from Minya Governorate
People who were court-martialed